Guo Jia (170– October 207), courtesy name Fengxiao, was an adviser to the warlord Cao Cao during the late Eastern Han dynasty of China. Throughout his 11 years of service, Guo Jia aided Cao Cao greatly with his brilliance and foresight, and his strategies were instrumental to Cao Cao's triumphs over rival warlords such as Lü Bu and Yuan Shao. For example, four years before Cao Cao's decisive victory over Yuan Shao at the Battle of Guandu, Guo Jia already foresaw that Cao Cao would win when he pointed out ten advantages Cao Cao had over Yuan Shao.

Historical sources on Guo Jia's life
The authoritative historical source on Guo Jia's life is the Records of the Three Kingdoms (Sanguozhi), which was written by Chen Shou in the third century. In the fifth century, Pei Songzhi annotated the Sanguozhi by incorporating information from other sources to Chen Shou's original work and adding his personal commentary. Some alternative texts used in the annotations to Guo Jia's biography include: Fu Zi, by Fu Xuan; Wei Shu (Book of Wei), by Wang Chen, Xun Yi and Ruan Ji; Shiyu (Accounts of this Generation), by Guo Song.

Early life
Guo Jia was from Yangzhai County, Yingchuan Commandery, which is in present-day Yuzhou, Henan. As a youth, he was famous for his intelligence and foresight. Since reaching adulthood at around the age of 19, Guo Jia had been travelling around the country and befriending members of the scholar-gentry and other talented persons. He did not associate himself with the hoi polloi and was thus not very well known outside of his circles. However, all those who knew him recognised his talent and felt that he was extraordinary. When he was 26, he served in the Han government as a minor official in the office of the Minister over the Masses.

Guo Jia once travelled to Hebei to meet Yuan Shao, an influential warlord who controlled most of northern China at the time. He later told Yuan Shao's advisers Xin Ping and Guo Tu, "An intelligent adviser should be prudent when he chooses which lord he wishes to serve so that his lord will heed every piece of advice he gives. The adviser can then establish his reputation. Lord Yuan (Yuan Shao) wishes to mimic the Duke of Zhou by recruiting men of talent to serve under him but he does not know how to tap into their abilities. He focuses too much on unnecessary details and neglects the main points; he likes to listen to many ideas but is indecisive. It is difficult for him to save the Empire from its troubles and achieve hegemony over the various warlords!" Guo Jia then left Yuan Shao.

Coming to serve Cao Cao
Around the time, Cao Cao had a brilliant adviser, Xi Zhicai, whom he appreciated greatly, but Xi died early. Cao Cao told another adviser Xun Yu, "Ever since Xi Zhicai died, I've been lacking someone whom I can form strategies with. I heard there are many talents in the Ru and Ying regions. Who can replace Xi Zhicai?" Xun Yu recommended Guo Jia to Cao Cao. Cao Cao and Guo Jia had a discussion on the affairs of their time, after which the former remarked: "This must be the man who will help me achieve greatness." Guo Jia also happily said, "He's truly the lord I wish to serve." Guo Jia was then appointed as a Libationer in the army of Cao Cao, who then held the position of Minister over the Masses in the Han imperial court.

Evaluation of Cao Cao's advantages over Yuan Shao
The Fu Zi recorded a detailed conversation between Guo Jia and Cao Cao, in which the former carefully pointed out ten advantages the latter had over Yuan Shao. Cao Cao asked Guo Jia, "Benchu (Yuan Shao) rules Ji, Qing and Bing provinces and has vast territories and large numbers of troops under his command. However, he has also been making offensive moves. I intend to attack him, but my forces are weaker than his, so what should I do?"

Guo Jia replied, 

Cao Cao laughed and said, "If what you've said is true, I feel really flattered." Guo Jia said, "Yuan Shao is now occupied in a war with Gongsun Zan in the north. We should head east to attack Lü Bu. If we don't eliminate Lü Bu first, when Yuan Shao attacks us and Lü Bu assists him, we'll be in deep trouble." Cao Cao agreed with Guo Jia.

Cao Cao's campaign against Lü Bu

In 198, Cao Cao launched a campaign against his rival Lü Bu in Xu Province, leading to the Battle of Xiapi. Lü Bu lost three battles and retreated to Xiapi (下邳; present-day Pizhou, Jiangsu). Cao Cao's forces besieged the city for months but they still could not conquer it because Lü Bu and his men resisted firmly. By then, Cao Cao's troops were tired and weary of battle, so Cao intended to withdraw his forces. However, Guo Jia and Xun You told Cao Cao, "Lü Bu is courageous but foolhardy. His army's morale is low because he has already lost three battles. The troops look up to their commander. If their commander shows any sign of weakness, the men will lose their fighting spirit. Lü Bu may have Chen Gong as an intelligent adviser but the latter's strategies always come late. Now, we should take advantage of this situation, when the morale of Lü Bu's forces is low and when Chen Gong has yet to think of a solution, to press on a fierce attack and we'll achieve victory." Cao Cao heeded their advice and directed the waters of the Yi and Si rivers to flood Xiapi, resulting in his triumph over Lü Bu.

The Fu Zi recorded another piece of advice Guo Jia gave to Cao Cao during the Battle of Xiapi: "In the past, Xiang Yu never lost any of the over 70 battles he fought in, but once the tide turned against him, he ended up in death and destruction. This was due to his reliance on his personal courage and his negligence towards strategy. Lü Bu has lost three consecutive battles and his army's morale is low and his defences are weakening. His might is not comparable to Xiang Yu, and he is now overwhelmed by defeat and weariness. If we take advantage of our successes to press on the attack on him, we can defeat him." Cao Cao agreed with him.

Advice to Cao Cao on how to handle Liu Bei
According to the Wei Shu, Guo Jia advised Cao Cao on how to handle Liu Bei when Liu Bei came to join Cao Cao in 196, after Lü Bu seized control of Xu Province from Liu's general Zhang Fei. On Cao Cao's suggestion, Emperor Xian appointed Liu Bei as the Governor of Yu Province. Someone told Cao Cao, "Liu Bei has the ambition of a hero. If you don't eliminate him now, he'll become a threat to you in the future." Cao Cao asked Guo Jia for his opinion, to which Guo replied, "That's true. However, when you raised an army in the name of righteousness and pledged to help the common people eliminate tyrants, you attracted talented and capable people to serve under you based on your sincerity and integrity. Liu Bei is known to be a hero, so if you kill him when he comes to serve you, you will be viewed as someone who harms men of virtue. Other talented persons will start to doubt you and may even change their minds about serving you. If that happens, who will help you achieve your goals? Therefore, it's imperative that you carefully consider the consequences of ruining your good reputation for the sake of eliminating one man who poses a threat to you." Cao Cao laughed and said, "I understand."

However, the Fu Zi gave a completely different account of Guo's advice to Cao Cao on how to handle Liu Bei. Guo Jia told Cao Cao, "Liu Bei has great ambitions and has won the hearts of many people. Zhang Fei and Guan Yu are formidable fighters and they have pledged to serve him with their lives. From what I observe, Liu Bei will never truly submit to anyone, and his intentions are unclear. The people in the past once said, 'If you let the enemy off today, they will become a threat to you for a long time.' You should settle (Liu Bei) soon." At the time, Cao Cao was using Emperor Xian as a figurehead to command respect and had attracted many heroes to serve under him so he did not heed Guo Jia's advice. When Cao Cao later sent Liu Bei with an army to attack Yuan Shu, Guo Jia and Cheng Yu warned Cao, "Liu Bei will rebel if you let him go!" By then, Liu Bei had already left and he really did rebel against Cao Cao as he later seized control of Xu Province from Che Zhou, the provincial governor appointed by Cao Cao. Cao Cao regretted not following Guo Jia's advice.

Pei Songzhi noted that the Wei Shu account is exactly the opposite of the Fu Zi account, but did not give his opinion on which he regarded to be the genuine one. The Chronicles of Huayang stated that following Lu Bu's defeat at Xiapi. Both Cheng Yu and Guo Jia encouraged Cao Cao to have Liu Bei killed but that Cao Cao refused fearing that such an act may hurt his reputation.

Prediction of Sun Ce's death
Between 194 and 199, the warlord Sun Ce embarked on a series of conquests in Jiangdong and seized control of most of the territories in the region. Around 200, Cao Cao finally engaged Yuan Shao at the Battle of Guandu. When Sun Ce heard that Cao Cao was locked in a stalemate with Yuan Shao at Guandu, he planned to lead an army across the Yangtze River and launch a surprise attack on the imperial capital Xu (許; present-day Xuchang, Henan), which was Cao Cao's base. When Cao Cao's men received news of the impending assault, they were all shocked and frightened, but Guo Jia said, "Sun Ce had newly conquered the lands in Jiangdong and he killed many heroes whose followers were willing to die for them. Besides, Sun Ce is overly confident and is unprepared, so even though he has thousands of troops, the situation is not much different from him setting out to conquer the Central Plains all by himself. If he encounters assassins, he'll have to deal with them alone. From what I observe, he'll eventually die at the hands of a common man." Guo Jia's prediction came true as Sun Ce was assassinated by the followers of Xu Gong (a commandery administrator he killed earlier) before he could even carry out his plan.

Pei Songzhi commented that Guo Jia's accurate prediction of Sun Ce's assassination was a display of Guo's foresight, but not a good gauge of Guo's brilliance because Guo did not manage to predict which year Sun Ce would die. He felt that it was purely coincidental that Sun Ce was assassinated in the same year he was planning to attack Xu.

Suggestion to Cao Cao to attack Liu Bei first before attacking Yuan Shao
According to the Fu Zi, before the Battle of Guandu, Cao Cao wanted to attack Liu Bei (who had rebelled and seized control of Xu Province) first before dealing with Yuan Shao. However, some of Cao Cao's advisers expressed their worries that Yuan Shao would take advantage of their absence to attack them, rendering them trapped between Yuan and Liu Bei. Cao Cao faced a dilemma so he asked Guo Jia for his opinion. Guo Jia suggested, "Yuan Shao is suspicious and he hesitates before he makes any decision, so he won't make his move fast. Liu Bei had just taken control of Xu Province so his situation isn't stable yet. He can be easily defeated if we attack him fast and hard. This is a critical opportunity, we mustn't lose it." Cao Cao agreed and immediately led an army east to attack Liu Bei and defeated the latter. After his defeat, Liu Bei fled to Hebei to join Yuan Shao. Throughout that period of time, Yuan Shao did not make any move.

However, Pei Songzhi commented that Guo Jia was not the one who pointed out Yuan Shao's weakness and suggested to launch a swift attack on Liu Bei. Rather, according to Cao Cao's biography in the Sanguozhi, it was Cao who thought of that plan himself.

Cao Cao's campaigns against Yuan Shao's sons
Cao Cao scored a decisive victory over Yuan Shao at the Battle of Guandu in 200. Yuan Shao died two years after his defeat and his sons Yuan Tan and Yuan Shang started fighting each other for control over their father's vast domain. Cao Cao defeated Yuan Tan and Yuan Shang at the Battle of Liyang in 202–203 and won several consecutive battles. At the time, many of Cao Cao's generals urged Cao to take advantage of his successes to continue attacking the Yuans, but Guo Jia said, "Yuan Shao loved both sons so he couldn't decide between them who would succeed him. With advisers like Guo Tu and Pang Ji to assist the Yuans, internal conflict will definitely break out between them. If we press on our attacks, the Yuans will unite to resist us. If we withdraw our forces, the Yuans will start fighting among themselves. Why don't we turn south and attack Liu Biao in Jing Province first? We should wait until the Yuan brothers start fighting each other and then attack them. We'll achieve victory in this way." Cao Cao agreed and prepared for a campaign against Liu Biao.

Internal conflict did break out between Yuan Tan and Yuan Shang later, which resulted in Yuan Tan being defeated by his younger brother. Yuan Tan retreated to Pingyuan and sent Xin Pi to meet Cao Cao, agreeing to surrender to Cao and requesting for assistance in dealing with Yuan Shang. Cao Cao led his forces north and defeated Yuan Shang at the Battle of Ye in 204. In 205, Cao Cao attacked Yuan Tan on some pretence and defeated him at the Battle of Nanpi. By then, Cao Cao had pacified most of Ji Province in northern China. In recognition of his contributions, the Han imperial court enfeoffed Guo Jia as the Marquis of Weiyang Village.

Battle of White Wolf Mountain

When Cao Cao was preparing for another campaign against Yuan Shang (who had fled to join his second brother Yuan Xi and the Wuhuan tribes), many of his followers were worried that Liu Biao might send Liu Bei (who had become a vassal under Liu Biao) to attack Cao Cao's base, the imperial capital Xu (許; present-day Xuchang, Henan). However, Guo Jia said to Cao Cao, "Your military might may be very well known now, but the Wuhuan will definitely not set up defences because they are deluded by a false sense of security since they are far away from you. As such, if you seize this opportunity to launch a surprise attack on them, you can eliminate them. Besides, Yuan Shao treated the ethnic minorities well and the Yuan brothers are still alive. Now, the people of northern China submit to you because they fear your military might, and you've yet to pacify them through benevolent governance. If you abandon the campaign and head south instead, the Wuhuan and Yuan Shao's former followers might rally the support of the people in northern China, who are likely to respond to their call. When that happens, the attention of Tadun (a Wuhuan chieftain) will be aroused and he may think of attacking you, and by then we would have lost Qing and Ji provinces. Liu Biao is a person who does nothing but sit and talk. He also does not trust Liu Bei as the latter is more capable than him – if he entrusts Liu Bei with important responsibilities, he will be worried that the latter will no longer submit to him; if he gives Liu Bei trivial tasks to do, the latter will be reluctant to serve him. Even if you empty your territories to campaign far away, you have no worries." Cao Cao proceeded with his campaign against the Yuan brothers and the Wuhuan.

When Cao Cao's forces arrived at Yi, Guo Jia said, "A swift army is powerful. Now, as we've travelled a long distance, we have much heavy baggage so we cannot launch a swift attack. If the enemy learns of our approach, they will definitely prepare defences. Why don't we leave the heavy baggage behind and send our light forces to take a shortcut and launch a surprise attack?" Cao Cao led his army through a secret passage at Lulong Pass and headed directly towards the Wuhuan chieftains' headquarters. The Wuhuan were shocked when they heard of Cao Cao's approach and they hastily assembled their army, but were defeated by Cao Cao at the Battle of White Wolf Mountain. Tadun was killed in battle. The Yuan brothers fled to Liaodong to join the warlord Gongsun Kang, who captured and executed them and then sent their heads to Cao Cao.

Death
Guo Jia was known for his deep foresight, which allowed him to accurately predict the outcomes of events. Cao Cao once remarked, "Only Fengxiao knows what's on my mind."

Chen Qun once made many complaints about Guo Jia, saying how Guo was very unbridled in his ways. Guo Jia, however, remained calm in the face of these accusations. Cao Cao still regarded Guo Jia highly but was also pleased that Chen Qun stood by his own principles.

Guo Jia fell ill after departing from Liucheng (柳城; in present-day Chaoyang County, Liaoning) following Cao Cao's victory at the Battle of White Wolf Mountain in 207. He was 38 years old (by East Asian age reckoning) at that time and he died not long later. Cao Cao was very grieved by Guo Jia's death. He told Xun You, "All of you are around the same age as me; only Fengxiao was the youngest. I planned to entrust him with responsibilities before my death, but it's destined that he would die at such a young age."

Cao Cao then wrote a memorial to Emperor Xian: "Army Libationer Guo Jia had served in the military for 11 years. There would be a discussion whenever we faced difficult situations, and when I could not decide on what to do, he was the one who helped me arrive at my decisions. He has made great contributions in the pacification of the Empire. It is unfortunate that he died early and did not manage to complete his task. We should not forget his contributions. I suggest that his family be granted an additional 800 taxable households under their control, making it a total of 1,000 households." The Wei Shu recorded a longer memorial written by Cao Cao to Emperor Xian, requesting for Guo Jia to be honoured. Guo Jia was granted the posthumous title "Marquis Zhen", which literally means "chaste marquis".

In 209, when Cao Cao was returning to Xu (許; present-day Xuchang, Henan) after his defeat at the Battle of Red Cliffs, he passed by Baqiu, where a plague broke out in his army. He ordered the boats to be burnt, and sighed, "If Guo Fengxiao was around, I wouldn't have ended up like this." Cao Cao mourned Guo Jia again. He also wrote to Xun Yu twice to lament Guo Jia's death.

Family
Guo Jia's peerage was inherited by his son, Guo Yi, whose courtesy name was Boyi. Wang Chang wrote in his book Family Rules that Guo Yi was "well-read and intelligent, but prejudiced and not generous in how he treated others; he was respectful towards people he favoured, but contemptuous towards people he disliked." Wang Chang thus hoped that his children would learn from Guo Yi's example and not be like him. Guo Yi served as a Literary Scholar of the Crown Prince in the state of Cao Wei during the Three Kingdoms period and died relatively early like his father before him.

Guo Yi's son, Guo Shen, inherited his father's peerage, and was in turn succeeded by his son Guo Lie when he died.

Guo Jia had another grandson, Guo Chang, whose courtesy name was Taizhong. Guo Chang was known for his brilliance and he served as a Regular Mounted Attendant in the Cao Wei state during the Three Kingdoms period.

In Romance of the Three Kingdoms
Guo Jia appears as a character in the historical novel Romance of the Three Kingdoms (Sanguo Yanyi) by Luo Guanzhong, which romanticises the historical events before and during the Three Kingdoms period.

In chapter 33 of the novel, Guo Jia was accompanying Cao Cao on his campaign against the Yuan brothers (Yuan Shang and Yuan Xi) and the Wuhuan when he fell sick because he could not adjust to the climate. He advised Cao Cao to leave the heavy baggage behind and launch a swift attack on the enemy with a light force, which resulted in Cao's victory later at the Battle of White Wolf Mountain. Guo Jia remained in Yizhou to recover and did not follow Cao Cao to the frontline. When Cao Cao returned to Yizhou later, he was deeply grieved to hear that Guo Jia had already died several days ago. Before his death, Guo Jia wrote Cao Cao a note, whose contents were not revealed until later in the chapter. When Cao Cao received news that Yuan Shang and Yuan Xi had fled to Liaodong to join the warlord Gongsun Kang, his subordinates urged him to either attack Liaodong or return to Xu (許; present-day Xuchang, Henan), but Cao told them to wait until they had received the Yuan brothers' heads. Just then, Cao Cao heard that Gongsun Kang had captured and killed the Yuan brothers and sent their heads to him, and his followers were very surprised. Cao Cao then revealed Guo Jia's note, which stated: "I heard that Yuan Xi and Yuan Shang had fled to Liaodong. You should not mobilise the army. Gongsun Kang had long feared that the Yuans would conquer his territory so he would definitely feel suspicious when the Yuan brothers join him. If you attack them, they will unite to resist you and you cannot overcome them quickly; if you do not move, Gongsun Kang and the Yuans will fight each other, and this is definite."

In popular culture

Guo Jia is first introduced as a playable character in the Xtreme Legends version of the seventh instalment in Koei's Dynasty Warriors video game series. He also appears in Koei's Dynasty Tactics and Romance of the Three Kingdoms series.

He is portrayed by Wang Jinxin in the 2010 Chinese television series Three Kingdoms.

See also
 Lists of people of the Three Kingdoms

Notes

References
 Chen, Shou (3rd century). Records of the Three Kingdoms (Sanguozhi).

 
 Pei, Songzhi (5th century). Annotations to Records of the Three Kingdoms (Sanguozhi zhu).

Other citations

 Sima, Guang (1084). Zizhi Tongjian.
 Luo, Guanzhong (14th century). Romance of the Three Kingdoms (Sanguo Yanyi).

170 births
207 deaths
Officials under Yuan Shao
Officials under Cao Cao
Politicians from Xuchang
Han dynasty politicians from Henan